The Rat King is a fictional character from the Teenage Mutant Ninja Turtles multimedia franchise. The character was created by Jim Lawson and first appeared in the comic Tales of the Teenage Mutant Ninja Turtles #4 written by Jim Lawson and has made various appearances since, in the comic books and other media, such as animated series' and video games.

The Rat King was born and raised in Boston and later migrated to New York, he remains one of the more enigmatic characters in Teenage Mutant Ninja Turtles, with various appearances depicting him as either a villain, a neutral character and even an ally of Teenage Mutant Ninja Turtles. The Rat King has distinguishable attire, which consists of filthy, tattered rags and, most prominently, various bandages covering his body. The Rat King has apparent telepathic influence over rats.

Appearances

Mirage Comics
In the Mirage Studios Teenage Mutant Ninja Turtles comics, the Rat King makes his first appearance in Tales of the Teenage Mutant Ninja Turtles #4 as the story's main antagonist. After residing in a swamp for several months, the Rat King (who remains unnamed until the end of the issue) decides to venture into a nearby abandoned industrial park and use it as shelter against the oncoming winter. There, the Rat King happens upon the Teenage Mutant Ninja Turtles and their friend Casey Jones, who had come to the industrial park to train. Believing the Turtles and Casey to be other "monsters" who wish to take his territory, the Rat King proceeds to stalk them throughout the park, even capturing Michelangelo and leaving him to be devoured by the rats (Michelangelo later escapes). The Rat King is eventually defeated by Leonardo who, in a duel with the Rat King, flings several shurikens at him, which knock him off balance, sending him plummeting into the bowels of a silo.

In the multi-part storyline "City at War", the Rat King appears in a major role. After entering the silo where Leonardo defeated the Rat King, Splinter falls into a pit and injures his leg; left helpless, Splinter is found by the Rat King, who appears before him multiple times throughout the story-arc, often debating philosophically with him and giving him cryptic advice in dreams. Splinter soon has a dream in which the Rat King appears before him as a demonic rat-like entity, and tells him to devour a rat to regain his strength. Rat King also tells Splinter that eating rats has allowed him to "find what he was looking for", and also states that he had been waiting for Splinter to come to him for some time. Two months later, after the Rat King stops appearing to him he gets enough strength and leaves the silo.  Splinter finds, much to his surprise, the heavily decayed corpse of the Rat King buried under rubble, its limbs twisted and several shurikens imbedded in it.

After several years of absence, the Rat King (in ghost form) reappears in a brief cameo appearance in Teenage Mutant Ninjas Turtles Vol. 4, watching as Splinter succumbs to a heart attack and dies while retrieving milk from a refrigerator. Much of the Rat King's origin is later revealed in an issue of Tales of the Teenage Mutant Ninja Turtles Vol. 2; the story reveals that a group of beings known as the Pantheon exists, with each member of the group having jurisdiction over a species of animal. When the time of the Pantheon member who rules the rats reaches an end, a new one is chosen, a scarred and heavily bandaged (explaining the Rat King's appearance) patient at a hospital. Becoming the Rat King, the man challenges Splinter to a battle, which he loses after a long fight. With the Rat King defeated, Splinter is offered a chance to take his place in the Pantheon, which he refuses. Accepting Splinter's decision, the Pantheon and Rat King leave, though not before stating that Splinter will be offered membership in the Pantheon one more time, at the moment of his death.

Teenage Mutant Ninja Turtles (1987–1996)
Despite being a minor character in the Mirage comics at the time of its initial airing, the Rat King (voiced by Townsend Coleman) is featured as a recurring character in the 1987 Teenage Mutant Ninja Turtles animated series, being one of the few villains from the Mirage comics to make the transition into the cartoon (the others being the Shredder, The Foot Clan, the Triceratons, and Dr. Stockman). The cartoon counterpart of the Rat King was somewhat inconsistent in some regards to his comic version, being shown with blonde or orange hair instead of black and having a slightly altered costume; his first few appearances on the show also had him controlling rats with a flute (à la The Pied Piper of Hamelin) instead of his mind as in later episodes. Even Splinter was affected by the music and almost killed the TMNT in a fight. The cartoon version of the Rat King was also depicted as highly intelligent, shown to be able to create such things as various chemical concoctions and bombs.

In the series, the Rat King is shown as a homeless man living in a dilapidated portion of the New York City sewer system near the Turtles and Splinter. In episodes featuring him, the Rat King would often enact some sort of plot to establish his own rat-controlled government and bring human rule to an end, believing that rats (which he counted himself as) were superior to all other species, whom he described as "inferior non-rodents." He occasionally joined other villains in group efforts that would, he thought, ultimately help his own goals. In some episodes of the show, the Rat King is depicted as somewhat of an anti-hero, with him, on one occasion, even helping the Turtles rescue a captured April O'Neil. When not actively seeking to expand his "empire", the Rat King eventually seemed content to simply remain underground with his loyal rats and, it seems, realized it was more to his advantage to have the Turtles as allies than as enemies. His final appearance is in early season 8, with new attire, weapons, and mutated rats with the help of Shredder and Krang, however, the Turtles manage to capture him. He is not seen or mentioned again afterwards, but it is assumed that he is in jail for his crimes.

10 Episodes:
 01."Enter the Rat King"
 02."Return of the Fly"
 03."Pizza by the Shred"
 04."Leatherhead Meets the Rat King"
 05."The Great Boldini"
 06."Were-Rats from Channel 6"
 07."Splinter Vanishes"
 08."Donatello's Duplicate"
 09."Night of the Rogues"
 10."Wrath of the Rat King"

Archie Comics
In Archie Comics Teenage Mutant Ninja Turtles Adventures series, the Rat King is given the name Lord Ha'ntaan. The Rat King's first appearance in the Archie Comics is in issue eleven, where the Turtles encounter him while searching for the Shredder in the sewers. The Rat King allows the Turtles to pass him unhindered and tells them where the Shredder is, after Leonardo proves that he and his brothers mean him and his rat subjects no harm.

The Rat King has an extended role in "The Future Shark Trilogy", which reveals him to be still active several decades in the future (showing no signs of having aged at all). After the future version of Donatello exterminated most of the world's rat population, in a future where floods following global warming causing rats to enter the houses in the towns, the Rat King declares war on him and his allies for killing so many of his "children". Though mentioned throughout "The Future Shark Trilogy", the Rat King only appears in person in the story-arc's last issue, which has him engaging in a battle royal with the Turtles, their allies and several other villains. The Rat King is defeated in the issue after Verminator X accidentally floods the room everyone is in, washing the Rat King and his rats away.

Teenage Mutant Ninja Turtles (2003–2009)
In the 2003 Teenage Mutant Ninja Turtles the Rat King (who is never referred to as such and voiced by David Zen Mansley) appears in the episode "I, Monster", which is an adaptation of his first appearance in the Mirage Comics. Instead of dying like in the comics, the Rat King survives the fall into the silo after his fight with Leonardo.

Throughout "I, Monster", various flashbacks reveal the origin of this series' version of the Rat King; the episode reveals the Rat King was originally the Slayer, from the episode "Bishop's Gambit", a prototype bio-mechanical cyborg super soldier created by Agent Bishop using genetically manipulated, alien, the turtles, his own and Splinter's DNA. The Slayer was meant to be used to fight off any alien threats and was given a test run against the Turtles, who broke into Bishop's laboratory looking for the kidnapped Splinter. The Slayer was presumed destroyed when a fight between him, the Turtles, Splinter and Bishop flooded the agent's lab. In actuality, the Slayer survived and was sent hurdling through the sewers, eventually being deposited near the industrial park the events of "I, Monster" take place in. Losing several of his robotic parts, cloaking device and healing ability, the Slayer degenerated into an even more monstrous form, becoming the Rat King.

The Rat King makes a later appearance in the episode "Wedding Bells and Bytes", secretly watching Casey and April's wedding near the end of the episode with a smile.

Teenage Mutant Ninja Turtles (2012–2017)
The Rat King appeared in the 2012 Teenage Mutant Ninja Turtles cartoon, voiced by Jeffrey Combs. In this series, the Rat King was introduced as Victor Falco, a scientist working on a neurochemical that allows him to read thoughts, and ultimately, to anticipate every move the Turtles make. He first appeared in "Monkey Brains," where the Turtles discovered that Falco had been experimenting on his partner, Dr. Tyler Rockwell, and turned him into a humanoid mutant chimpanzee that can read emotions, with Donatello defeating him in a fight by utilizing Splinter's earlier lessons about how to avoid thinking in a fight. In "I, Monster," Falco went into hiding to continue his research in a rat-infested lab before he is subjected to an explosion caused when one of the rats gnawed through an electrical wire that fell into the neurochemical. While the explosion left Falco blind and horribly disfigured, it gave him the means to only telepathically control rats but see through their eyes. 

Now gaunt and corpse-like, Falco dubbed himself The Rat King and tried to use his new psychic abilities to manipulate Splinter into fighting and killing his own mutated turtle sons, but Splinter somehow managed to regain control of himself and knocks out Rat King with nothing but two fingers, whose unconscious body was carried away by his rats. In "Of Rats and Men," The Rat King returns and used his abilities to access Splinter's mind for knowledge of the mutagen to create an army of mutant rats under his control. Despite his increasing control of Splinter as he used him to attack the Turtles, Splinter continued to resist Rat King's control, which was broken when Michaelangelo threw his "ice cream kitty" at him, attacking him and breaking his control over Splinter. Though the Rat King had the advantage over Splinter by using both his sight and his pet rat "Aristotle", Splinter managed to remove the Rat King's advantage with their fight concluded when the Rat King's last attempt on Splinter caused him to fall off a high ledge to his death. The Rat King returns in "Darkest Plight," after a wounded Splinter ended up falling into the chasm. Rat King proceeds to torture Splinter until he is defeated, revealed to be the product of a fever-induced dream when Splinter comes to and finds the real Rat King's skeletal remains.

IDW Publishing
In the IDW comic book series, the Rat King reveals himself as the brother of Kitsune, who had previously brainwashed Leonardo. Both are members of an ancient immortal family that ruled earth before mankind; he revealed they had been hiding through the ages and only used their powers sparingly—referencing the Pied Piper of Hamelin he states his role as "Sometimes to reward. Sometimes to punish". He is shown, like his sister, to have powerful hallucinogenic and magic powers, able to prevent Leonardo from speaking and Splinter from movement while creating illusions within their minds similar to those of his sister. He often speaks in rhyme and is shown dwelling with and eating rats; he commands the rats to crawl on top of Leo and Splinter before casting his illusions. He admires Splinter's fatherly instincts and is impressed by Leonardo's ability to resist the hallucinations. Before disappearing, he states his desire to use the two in the upcoming "game for the world" and wipes their memories of the encounter.

References to the Pantheon from the Mirage Comics are also made in the form of a group of immortal creatures - which include the Rat King and his cohorts Kitsune and Chi-You - seeking to subvert humanity to their will via a subtle game of intrigue and manipulation, in which the main mutant characters in the series - including the Turtles, Splinter and the mutant polar fox Alopex - are meant to play a decisive role.

Video games
The Rat King appears as a boss in the Super NES version of Teenage Mutant Ninja Turtles: Turtles in Time, battling the player using the Footski equipped with missiles and spiked buoys. The Rat King also appears as a boss and unlockable playable character in the Super NES version of Teenage Mutant Ninja Turtles: Tournament Fighters.

The Slayer version of the Rat King from the 2003 animated series also appears as the boss of Episode Two in Teenage Mutant Ninja Turtles 3: Mutant Nightmare. It also appears as a recurring boss in the Nintendo DS version, at one point fighting alongside Agent Bishop himself.

The Rat King is the primary foe of the first act of the 2014 3DS game, and functions as the game's second boss.

References

External links
 Rat King Profile Information from the Official Ninja Turtles Site

Clone characters in comics
Comics characters introduced in 1988
Comics characters with accelerated healing
Comics characters with superhuman strength
Fictional ghosts
Fictional cyborgs
Fictional telepaths
Teenage Mutant Ninja Turtles characters
Fictional characters who can turn invisible
Fictional genetically engineered characters
Fictional humanoids
Video game bosses
Fictional scientists in comics
Fictional kidnappers
Fictional super soldiers
Fictional characters from Boston
Fictional mutants
Male characters in comics
Fictional murdered people